Echo Beach is a British soap opera that aired on ITV in 2008. Set in the fictional Cornish coastal town of Polnarren, it ran for twelve episodes from 10 January to 21 March 2008. The show was created by Tony Jordan and produced by Kudos for ITV.

Synopsis
Echo Beach was inter-linked with a show named Moving Wallpaper, a comedy-drama set in the fictional production offices of Echo Beach. Echo Beach was shown immediately after Moving Wallpaper in the schedule, with Moving Wallpaper airing at 9 pm on Fridays and Echo Beach airing at 9.30 pm. Although initially intended to be shown on ITV2, straight after Moving Wallpaper on ITV, the decision was made to have both on ITV.

The theme song was a cover of Martha and the Muffins' "Echo Beach" by Gabriella Cilmi.

According to the parallel Moving Wallpaper storyline, the soap was originally titled Polnarren, and was intended to be a worthy drama about social issues in Cornwall. The show was then "sexed up", and its name changed to Echo Beach, by new producer Jonathan Pope (played by Ben Miller).

Plot summary
The soap is centred on Susan Penwarden (played by Martine McCutcheon) and her ex-lover Daniel Marrack (Jason Donovan), who after a long absence, and following the death of his wife, returns to Polnarren to run a beachfront café and surf shop with his daughter Abi (Hannah Lederer-Alton) and son Brae (Christian Cooke).

An old feud between Daniel and Susan's manipulative husband Mark (Hugo Speer) flares up, while Susan's and Mark's son Jimmy (Ed Speleers) becomes involved with Abi. Jimmy overhears a conversation suggesting that he might be Daniel's son, not Mark's, making his relationship with Abi incestuous. A shocked Jimmy breaks up with Abi, leaving her to have drunken and regretted sex with his friend Charlie (Jonathan Readwin). A blood test later proves the paternity claim to be false, allowing Jimmy to make amends with Abi, who keeps secret the details of the night she spent with Charlie.

Meanwhile, as Susan and Daniel try to control their feelings for each other, Mark starts an affair with a scheming romantic fiction writer, Angela Cole (Susie Amy), who has previously struck up a false friendship with Susan. When Susan finds out about Mark's infidelity she walks out into the arms of Daniel.

Various subplots supplement the main storylines. Narinder Gurai (Chandeep Uppal) is a terminally ill barmaid who escaped to Polnarren to live out her final days in peace. She is perpetually trying to ensnare Charlie, though Charlie is too dim to realise this. Ivy Trehearne (Gwyneth Powell), the rustic landlady of the local pub, has a soft spot for fellow rustic Fin Morgan (Johnny Briggs), a down-on-his-luck caravan park operator who is also Charlie's grandfather. Jackie Hughes (Naomi Ryan) and Ian Brenton (Marcus Patric) are a local couple who work at Fin's caravan park before a disastrous fire, accidentally started by Jimmy's younger sister Grace (Laura Greenwood), forces it to close. Jackie goes on to work in Daniel's café, and becomes the subject of romantic attentions from a brooding Brae, while Ian is himself the subject of attentions from Grace.

In the final episode of series 1, Charlie and Narinda finally get together, Jimmy and Abi fall out when Jimmy learns of Abi's one-night stand with Charlie, Ian and Jackie prepare for their wedding, and, in a confrontation on board Mark's pleasure boat, Mark forces Susan to tell Daniel that she had, many years earlier, miscarried his child. A fight between Mark and Daniel ensues, during which both fall into the sea, their fate hanging in the balance.

Cast

Actors from Echo Beach sometimes cross over into the sister show, Moving Wallpaper; see Moving Wallpaper: Cast.

Filming locations
External filmed scenes are: quay/harbours of Looe and Polperro on Cornwall's south coast; long panoramic beach shots (and surfers) are of Watergate Bay, one of Cornwall's most popular surfing destinations, on the north coast; the large, almost mansion-sized, house on the hillside shots are also in Polperro. There are inconsistencies with props, locations and dialect in Echo Beach: the surfboards don't have surfboard wax on them; and the fictional Cornish characters do not sound convincingly Cornish.

Cancellation
A second series of Moving Wallpaper was commissioned and began airing on ITV on 27 February 2009. It was originally reported that Echo Beach would "most probably return, but not necessarily as it is now". However, in July 2008 it was confirmed that Echo Beach had in fact been cancelled. Series two of Moving Wallpaper instead focuses on the production of a "zombie" show called Renaissance.

Reception
The first episode of Echo Beach attracted 5 million viewers on average with a 21% audience share, easily winning the timeslot. The ratings later dropped to just 2.8 million and a 12% share. One month later, Echo Beach gained only 1.9 million viewers with an audience share of 8%, while a repeat of crime drama New Tricks attracted 4.7 million viewers for BBC One. Viewing figures then rallied slightly, to 2.3m.

Comments from some reviewers, as well as from viewers on discussion forums, indicated a degree of confusion about whether Echo Beach was intended to be a satirical send-up of lame soap operas or a bona fide dramatic offering. The Daily Mirror described the show as "not bad enough to be funny". The Sunday Mirror thought: "Strikingly bad acting, drearily predictable plot lines [...] Echo Beach is just like a normal soap. But there's a difference. This one is supposed to be rubbish. Or at least I think it is."

International airings
In Australia, series one of Echo Beach aired back-to-back with Moving Wallpaper on ABC2 each Friday from 8:30 pm, 30 May 2008. Both programs were later repeated on the higher-rated ABC1 channel a year later from 6 May 2009 starting on Wednesday nights. Yet, this time, Echo Beach was separated from its sister program and placed in an early Saturday evening timeslot three days later each week.

Episodes

DVD release

References

External links
 
 
 Show information and cast interviews

2000s British television soap operas
2008 British television series debuts
2008 British television series endings
British television spin-offs
English-language television shows
ITV soap operas
Television shows set in Cornwall